Julio César da Silva Rodríguez, the Julio César is a forward, who plays for Ironi Tiberias.

Career
Played in the Palmeiras.

Career statistics
(Correct )

Contract
 Palmeiras.

References

External links
 palmeiras.com.br

1990 births
Living people
Brazilian footballers
Sociedade Esportiva Palmeiras players
Oeste Futebol Clube players
Camboriú Futebol Clube players
Esporte Clube São Bento players
Marília Atlético Clube players
Independente Futebol Clube players
Associação Desportiva São Caetano players
Desportivo Brasil players
Hapoel Nof HaGalil F.C. players
Hapoel Ashkelon F.C. players
Hapoel Iksal F.C. players
Maccabi Bnei Reineh F.C. players
Ironi Tiberias F.C. players
Liga Leumit players
Brazilian expatriate footballers
Expatriate footballers in Israel
Brazilian expatriate sportspeople in Israel
Association football forwards